Claudio Marcelo Guerra Carrizo (born 22 December 1972 in Montevideo, Uruguay) is a former Uruguayan footballer who played for clubs of Uruguay, Chile, Colombia and Ecuador

Teams
  Progreso 1994–1995
  Santiago Wanderers 1996
  Progreso 1997
  Aucas 1998
  Peñarol 1998–1999
  Liverpool 1999
  Juventud Las Piedras 2000
  Millonarios 2000
  Independiente Santa Fe 2001
  Rentistas 2001
  El Tanque Sisley 2002–2003
  Sud América 2004–2006
  La Luz F.C. 2007

External links
 
 
 Profile at Oocities

1972 births
Living people
Uruguayan footballers
Uruguayan expatriate footballers
Liverpool F.C. (Montevideo) players
Juventud de Las Piedras players
El Tanque Sisley players
C.A. Rentistas players
Peñarol players
C.A. Progreso players
S.D. Aucas footballers
Millonarios F.C. players
Independiente Santa Fe footballers
Santiago Wanderers footballers
Chilean Primera División players
Uruguayan Primera División players
Categoría Primera A players
Expatriate footballers in Chile
Expatriate footballers in Colombia
Expatriate footballers in Ecuador
Association football midfielders